Brickellia tomentella is a Mesoamerican species of flowering plants in the family Asteraceae]. It is native to Central America (all 6 Spanish-speaking countries) and to southern Mexico (Chiapas and Oaxaca).

References

tomentella
Flora of Mexico
Plants described in 1852